Monique Wright (born 18 May 1973) is an Australian journalist and television presenter.

Wright is currently co-host of Weekend Sunrise.

Career 
Wright joined the Seven Network as a reporter in 1996.

In 2007, she was appointed weather presenter on the Seven Network's national breakfast program, Sunrise, replacing Grant Denyer. She remained in the role for a year before being replaced by meteorologist David Brown.

In June 2013, Wright was announced as a co-host of The Daily Edition. She remained with the show until 2015 and was replaced by Ryan Phelan.

From August 2013 to February 2014, Wright temporarily replaced Samantha Armytage as co-host on Weekend Sunrise and was officially appointed co-host in February 2014.

References

Living people
Australian television journalists
Seven News presenters
1973 births